Emilio Echeverry (8 March 1929 – May 2015) was a Colombian épée, foil and sabre fencer. He competed at the 1956, 1960 and 1964 Summer Olympics.

References

1929 births
2015 deaths
Colombian male épée fencers
Olympic fencers of Colombia
Fencers at the 1956 Summer Olympics
Fencers at the 1960 Summer Olympics
Fencers at the 1964 Summer Olympics
People from Caldas Department
Colombian male foil fencers
Colombian male sabre fencers
20th-century Colombian people